Welega (also spelled Wollega;) was a province in western Ethiopia, with its capital city at Nekemte. It was named for the Wollega Oromo, who are the majority of the population within its boundaries. 

Welega was bordered on the west by Sudan, on the north by the Abbay River which separated it from Gojjam, on the east by Shewa, on the southeast by Kaffa, and on the south by Illubabor.

History

The region was governed by Gasa Umar of Adal in the sixteenth century.

Following the liberation of Ethiopia in 1941, the following provinces were added to Welega to simplify administration: the semi-autonomous areas of Asosa, Beni Shangul, Leqa Naqamte, and Leqa Qellam, and the province of Sibu.

The boundaries of Welega remained unchanged until the adoption of new constitution in 1995, when Welega was divided, with part of its territory becoming the Asosa and Kamashi Zones of the Benishangul-Gumuz Region, and the rest becoming part of the Mirab Welega, Misraq Welega and Illubabor Zones of the Oromia Region.

See also
 History of Ethiopia

References

Benishangul-Gumuz Region
Oromia Region
Provinces of Ethiopia
States and territories disestablished in 1995